Nuckolls-Jefferies House, also known as the Nuckolls House and Wagstop Plantation, is a historic plantation house located near Pacolet, Cherokee County, South Carolina. It was built in 1843, with alterations in the 1870s or 1880s. It is a -story, frame residence in a combined Greek Revival / Classical Revival style.  It is clad in weatherboard and sits on a stone foundation. The front facade features a two-tiered central, pedimented portico supported by two sets of slender wooden posts. The rear of the house has a two-story ell, built during the 1996 restoration.  Also on the property are three contributing outbuildings: a small, one-story log gable-front building that dates from the mid-to-late 19th century that served as the farm's smokehouse, a -story gable-front frame barn, and another frame gable-front barn with side shed lean-to extensions.

It was listed in the National Register of Historic Places in 2007.

References

Plantation houses in South Carolina
Houses on the National Register of Historic Places in South Carolina
Greek Revival houses in South Carolina
Neoclassical architecture in South Carolina
Houses completed in 1843
Houses in Cherokee County, South Carolina
National Register of Historic Places in Cherokee County, South Carolina
1843 establishments in South Carolina